Eshwar Niwas born on April 11th 1974 is an Indian film director, known for his works predominantly in Bollywood and Tollywood. In 1999, he won the National Film Award for directing Shool.

Early life and career
He was born in Hyderabad. He ventured into Telugu film industry as an assistant director under the mentorship of Ram Gopal Varma. He subsequently entered Hindi cinema.

Filmography
As director
Total Siyapaa  (2014)
De Taali (2008)
My Name Is Anthony Gonsalves (2008)
Bardaasht (2004)
Dum (2003) 
Love Ke Liye Kuch Bhi Karega (2001)
Shool (1999)

As screenwriter
Dum (2003)
Shool (1999)

As producer
My Name Is Anthony Gonsalves (2008)

Awards
National Film Awards 
National Film Award for Best Feature Film in Hindi (director) – Shool – 1999

References

Year of birth missing (living people)
Hindi-language film directors
Living people
Film directors from Hyderabad, India
20th-century Indian film directors
21st-century Indian film directors
Film producers from Hyderabad, India
Telugu film directors